Adam Mosseri (born January 23, 1983) is an American-Israeli businessman and the head of Instagram. He formerly served as an executive at Facebook.

Early life and education 

Mosseri was born in New York City and raised in Chappaqua, New York. He is Jewish. He is the older brother of composer Emile Mosseri. He attended New York University's Gallatin School of Individualized Study to study media and information design. He graduated with a bachelor's degree in information design in 2005.

Career 
In 2003, while studying at NYU, Mosseri started his own design consultancy called Blank Mosseri, which focused on graphic, interaction, and exhibition design. His company had offices in New York and San Francisco. In 2007, he joined TokBox as the company's first designer.

Mosseri joined Facebook as a product designer in 2008. In 2009, Mosseri became a product design manager, and in 2012 became the design director for the company's mobile apps. From 2012 to 2016, Mosseri oversaw Facebook's News Feed section, and from 2016 to May 2018 served as vice president of product for Facebook. During his tenure at Facebook, he additionally oversaw Facebook Home, the company's unsuccessful attempt at bringing a mobile homescreen to Android devices.

After the 2016 presidential election, Mosseri took it upon himself to become the spokesperson for Facebook's stance on "fake news." During the 2018 Cambridge Analytica scandal, Mosseri was one of the few Facebook executives who was vocal about Facebook's role in providing security and trustworthy news.

In May 2018, Mosseri was named Instagram's vice president of product. On October 1, 2018, Facebook announced that Mosseri would assume as the new head of Instagram, following the resignation of the photo-sharing app's founders Kevin Systrom and Mike Krieger in September 2018. Mosseri's title as head of Instagram differs from the title of former leadership as CEO as Facebook reserves CEO titles for company founders. As company head, Mosseri is expected to hire a new executive team and oversee "all functions of the business".

Tech industry recognition 
In 2015, Business Insider recognized Mosseri as a Facebook "Power Player."

In 2017, Mosseri was a keynote speaker at the International Journalism Festival in Perugia, Italy.

In 2018, Mosseri spoke alongside Campbell Brown on behalf of Facebook's news features at Recode's Code Media conference.

In 2020, he was listed in the Tech category of Fortune's '40 Under 40' list.

Personal life 
Mosseri lives in San Francisco with his wife, Monica Mosseri. They have three sons. The Mosseri family is active in local philanthropic causes including the Shanti Project. Mosseri has dual U.S. and Israeli citizenship, as his father is Israeli.

References 

Living people
1983 births
American businesspeople in the online media industry
American people of Egyptian-Jewish descent
American people of Israeli descent
People from Chappaqua, New York
New York University alumni